All-Star Baseball 2000 is a video game developed by Iguana Entertainment and Realtime Associates and published by Acclaim Entertainment for the Game Boy Color and the Nintendo 64 in 1999.

Reception

The Nintendo 64 version received favorable reviews, just two points shy of universal acclaim, while the Game Boy Color version received mixed reviews, according to the review aggregation website GameRankings. The staff of Next Generation said in their July 1999 issue that just as they were about to give the former "a perfect rating", they "stumbled onto a handful of unfixed gameplay oversights and bugs. Two examples include still-shoddy AI glitches and the fact that the time of day never changes during season play, despite Iguana's option for it. This is still Nintendo 64's best baseball game, but with a little more work, it could have been a flawless sequel".

References

External links
 
 

1999 video games
Acclaim Entertainment games
All-Star Baseball video games
Cancelled Windows games
Game Boy Color games
Nintendo 64 games
Video games developed in the United States